Marysville Historic District may refer to:
Marysville Historic District (Marysville, Ohio), one of the National Register of Historic Places listings in Union County, Ohio
Marysville Historic District (Marysville, New Brunswick), Canada